The University of Waterloo, located in Waterloo, Ontario, Canada, is a comprehensive public university that was founded in 1957 by Drs. Gerry Hagey and Ira G. Needles. It has grown into an institution of more than 42,000 students, faculty, and staff. The school is notable for being the first accredited university in North America to create a Faculty of Mathematics, which is now the world's largest, and to have the largest cooperative education program in the world. The school is also known for having more companies formed by its faculty, students, and alumni than any other Canadian university, and as such, the university has been called the "Silicon Valley of the North".

The list is drawn from notable faculty, alumni, staff, and former university presidents. The enrollment for 2020 was 36,057 undergraduate and 6,231 graduate students, with 1,350 faculty members and 2,596 staff. About 221,000 people have graduated from the university, and now reside in over 150 countries.

Alumni and faculty
Fields with a "—" have unknown values.

Alumni

Faculty

Administration

Chancellors

Presidents

References

Waterloo
lists
University of Waterloo